Teizō, Teizo or Teizou (written: 禎三, 悌三 or 梯三) is a masculine Japanese given name. Notable people with the name include:

, Japanese entomologist
, Japanese composer and poet
, Japanese footballer

Japanese masculine given names